West Lunga National Park is a remote wildlife haven in dense forest in the North-Western Province of Zambia. It lies between the West Lunga River and Kabompo River about 10 km north of the gravel road from Solwezi to Kabompo, and covers about 1700 km².

The national park is the only one in Zambia covered by forest, categorised in the small Cryptosepalum dry forests ecoregion, which exists only in a few patches in the south west of the province extending a little over the border into Angola. Cryptosepalum trees (called "mukwe" locally) are evergreen and grow densely with a closed canopy. The ecoregion forms the largest evergreen forest in Africa outside of the equatorial zone. Although the rainfall in the area is quite high (above 1,000 mm per year) the soils are sandy and well drained so apart from the rivers there is a lack of surface water. A few patches of Miombo woodland and grassland also exist in the park.

The park lacks management, facilities, and roads. There is no accommodation and no towns nearby, visitors must be completely self-sufficient. (The Zambia Tourism website does not even mention the park.) It is reached by a dirt track from the main road to the park gate and base at Jivundu in its south-west. The lack of water and thickness of the forest has kept the human population low in the region, and despite some poaching and the absence of protection, the forest is believed to be still fairly rich in wildlife. Smaller forest mammals such as duiker and bushpigs live there, and recent reports also mention puku, hippopotami, Nile crocodiles, vervet monkeys, and yellow baboons. The game guards say there are buffalo, roan antelopes, sable antelopes, Lichtenstein's hartebeests, impalas, elands, and elephants.

References

National parks of Zambia
Geography of North-Western Province, Zambia
Kabompo River
Tourist attractions in North-Western Province, Zambia
Important Bird Areas of Zambia
Central Zambezian miombo woodlands